This is a list of sketches of notable people, or of their close relatives, drawn by Marguerite Martyn (American journalist, 1878-1948) and published in the St. Louis Post-Dispatch.

A
 Jane Addams, pioneer settlement worker
 Judge Glendy B. Arnold of the divorce court
 Carrie Thomas Alexander-Bahrenberg, University of Illinois trustee
 Helen Dinsmore Huntington Astor, Republican Party activist
 Nancy Astor, Viscountess Astor, British politician
 Rachel Foster Avery, pioneer suffragist

B
 Roger Nash Baldwin, a founder of the American Civil Liberties Union
 Illinois Congressman-elect William N. Baltz and his daughters
 Bertha Barr, delegate to 1936 Republican National Convention
 Ethel Barrymore, actress
 Alva Belmont, socialite and suffrage benefactor
 Mrs. Perry Belmont (Jessie Ann Robbins), wife of the New York politician and diplomat
 Sarah Bernhardt, actress
 Elizabeth Lucy Bibesco, English writer and socialite
 Amelia Bingham, actress
 Alice Stone Blackwell, suffrage leader and editor
 Emily Newell Blair, writer, suffragist, feminist, Democratic Party leader
 Harriot Stanton Blatch, suffragist
 Anna E. Blount, president of the National Medical Women's Association
 Susan Elizabeth Blow, educator, the "Mother of the Kindergarten"
 'Round-the-world journalist Nellie Bly
 Film actress Eleanor Boardman
 Lawyer and suffragist Inez Milholland Boissevain
 Catherine Booth-Clibborn of the Salvation Army,
 Louise DeKoven Bowen, financial supporter of suffrage movement
 Mary Carroll Craig Bradford, the only woman delegate at the 1908 Democratic National Convention in Denver, Colorado
 Catherine Breshkovsky, "grandmother of the Russian revolution"
 Helene Hathaway Robison Britton, owner of the St. Louis Cardinals
 Sallie Britton, daughter of James H. Britton, mayor of St. Louis, married to James Mackin, New York state treasurer
 Izetta Jewel Brown, actress, women's rights activist and Democratic politician
 Mary K. Browne, professional tennis player and amateur golfer
 Attorney Mary Baird Bryan and her husband, William Jennings Bryan, two-time presidential candidate, and two grandchildren
 Actress Billie Burke
 Mrs. Adolphus Busch III (Florence McRhea Lambert), first wife of the brewery executive
 Sarah Schuyler Butler, Republican activist

C
 S. Parkes Cadman, minister and advice columnist
 Steelmaker Andrew Carnegie
 Anna Ella Carroll, politician, pamphleteer and lobbyist
 Anna Case, opera singer 
 Dancer and animal-rights activist Irene Castle, wife of Chicago businessman Frederic McLaughlin
 Dancer Vernon Castle
 Carrie Chapman Catt, suffrage leader
 Espiridiona Cenda, dancer also known as Chiquita
 Cécile Chaminade, French composer
 Percival Chubb, Ethical Cultural Society leader
 Kate Claxton, actress
 Mrs. Cornelius Cole, one of the first three women accredited to a Republican National Convention
 Nancy Cook, suffragist, educator, political organizer, business woman
 Phoebe Couzins, lawyer
 Caroline Bartlett Crane, known as "America's housekeeper" for her efforts to improve sanitation
 Raymond Crane, comedian and actor
 Missouri Lieutenant Governor Wallace Crossley
 Mrs. Shelby Cullom (Julia Fisher), wife of the Illinois senator
 Pearl Lenore Curran, author and medium, wife of John H. Curran, Missouri immigration commissioner.

D
 Secretary of the Navy Josephus Daniels and his wife, Addie Worth Bagley
 Dwight F. Davis, businessman and founder of the Davis Cup
 Rose Davis, rodeo rider
 Thamara de Swirsky, dancer
 Actress Marie Doro
 Loren and Dora Doxey, accused of murder
 Anne Dallas Dudley, suffragist

E
 Aviator Amelia Earhart
 Crystal Eastman, feminist and political activist
 Catherine (Kitty) Elkins, daughter of Senator Stephen Benton Elkins, who wanted to marry Prince Luigi Amedeo, Duke of the Abruzzi 
 Effie Ellsler, actress
 Julian Eltinge, cross-dressing actor

F

 Martha P. Falconer, social reformer
 Diomede Falconio, apostolic delegate from the Vatican to the United States
 Frank H. Farris, attorney, member of both the Missouri state Senate and its House of Representatives
 Beatrice Farnham, artist and entrepreneur, the wife of John Otto (park ranger)
 Martha Ellis Fischel, social service worker, mother of Edna Fischel Gellhorn, suffragist and reformer
 Judith Ellen Foster, government official
 James F. Fulbright, representative, Missouri Legislature

G
 Joe Gans, boxer
 Mary Garden, actress
 Missouri Governor and Mrs. Fred Gardner
 Dancer Adeline Genée
 Edna Fischel Gellhorn (Mrs. George), suffragist and reformer
 James Gibbons, Roman Catholic cardinal
 Artist Charles Dana Gibson
 Irene Langhorne Gibson, philanthropist and Democratic National Convention delegate, the original Gibson Girl
 Catholic Archbishop John J. Glennon
 Emma Goldman, activist and writer
 Samuel Gompers, labor leader
 Edith Kelly Gould, wife of a millionaire Gould
 Edward Howland Robinson Green, the only son of the miser Hetty Green
 Isabella Greenway (Mrs. John C.), Arizona politician
 Minnie J. Grinstead, teacher, Republican politician, and temperance worker

H
 Mrs. Herbert S. Hadley (Agnes Lee), wife of Missouri's governor
 Beatrice Forbes-Robertson Hale, English actress, lecturer, and writer
Anna Dall, daughter of Franklin and Eleanor Roosevelt
 Florence Mabel Harding, wife of President Warren G. Harding
 Grace Carley Harriman, social leader and philanthropist
 Mary Garrett Hay, New York suffragist
 Grace Bryan Hargreaves, daughter of the William Jennings Bryans
 Millicent Hearst, philanthropist and wife of the newspaper magnate, William Randolph Hearst
 Robert Herrick (novelist)
 Sallie Aley Hert, Republican activist, married to Alvin Tobias Hert
 Dancer and choreographer Gertrude Hoffmann
 Helen B. Houston, wife of David F. Houston, secretary of agriculture
 Mrs. Patrick J. Hurley, wife of the Republican activist
 Writer Fannie Hurst
 May Arkwright Hutton, Idaho suffragist

J

 Charles "Buffalo" Jones, frontiersman, farmer, rancher, hunter, and conservationist
 Mary Harris Jones, or "Mother" Jones, labor organizer

K
 Annette Kellerman, athlete who swam the English Channel
 Florence Kelley, social and political reformer
 Araminta Cooper Kern, wife of John W. Kern, the Democratic candidate for Vice-President, and their son, William
 Missouri State Senator Thomas Kinney

L

 Mrs. Albert Bond Lambert, socialite. Her husband was an industrialist, aviator, and golfer.
 Mrs. William Palmer Ladd, wife of the dean of the Berkeley Divinity School
 Jacob M. Lashley, lawyer, debated film censorship
 Judge Ben Lindsey, social reformer
 Ruth Bryan Leavitt, politician and the first woman appointed as a United States ambassador
 Fifi Widener Leidy, daughter of Pennsylvania art collector Joseph E. Widener and wife of New York politician George Eustis Paine
 Lydia Lipkowska, opera singer
 Jack London, writer
 Alice Roosevelt Longworth, celebrity and daughter of Theodore Roosevelt
 Daniel A. Lord, American Catholic writer
 Joan Lowell, actress 
 Felice Lyne, singer

M
 Mrs. Norman E. Mack, wife of the editor and publisher of the Buffalo Daily Times, with their daughter, Norma
 Percy MacKaye, actor, director, playwright
 Elliot Woolfolk Major, Missouri governor, and his wife
 Richard Mansfield, actor
 Lois Marshall, wife of Vice-President Thomas R. Marshall
 Elisabeth Marbury, theatrical and literary agent and producer
 Anne Henrietta Martin, president of the National Woman's Party
 Frederick Townsend Martin, New York society leader and writer
 Ned Martin, dancer and choreographer
 Eleanor Randolph Wilson McAdoo, daughter of President Wilson and wife of William Gibbs McAdoo
 Ellen Wilson McAdoo, daughter of Eleanor Randolph Wilson McAdoo and William Gibbs McAdoo
 Sterling H. McCarty, representative, Missouri Legislature
 Edith Rockefeller McCormick (Mrs. Harold), socialite and opera patron
 Katrina McCormick, Republican activist
 Ruth Hanna McCormick (Mrs. Medill), Republican politician
 Catherine Waugh McCulloch, lawyer and suffragist
 Mary McDowell, social reformer
 George McManus, cartoonist, and Florence Bergere
 "Countess" Candido Mendes de Almeida, wife of the Brazilian politician
 Elizabeth Avery Meriwether, author and suffrage advocate
 Mrs. Lee Meriwether, wife of the author
 Patsy Ruth Miller, motion picture actress
 Tamaki Miura, opera singer
 Anne Tracy Morgan, philanthropist
 Alexander Pollock Moore, diplomat, editor and publisher
 Isabel Morrison, wife of New York politician Timothy Woodruff
 "Czar" Thomas E. Mulvihill Sr., St. Louis excise commissioner
 Actress, dancer, film producer, and screenwriter Mae Murray

N
 Alla Nazimova, actress
 Oscar Nelson, boxer
 Ione Page Nicoll, worked for repeal of the 18th (Prohibition) Amendment
 Lillian Nordica, opera singer

O
 Barbara Blackman O'Neil (Mrs. David), socialite and suffragist
 Mrs. John E. Osborne (Selena Smith), wife of the governor of Wyoming

P

 Theophile Papin, society leader and "squire of debutantes"
 Sylvia Pankhurst, English suffragist
 Charles Henry Parkhurst, social reformer
 Cissy Patterson, journalist and publisher
 Irene Pavloska, opera singer
 Anna J. Hardwicke Pennybacker (Mrs.Percy), president of the General Federation of Women's Clubs
 Alexandra Carlisle Pfeiffer, actress and suffragist
 Gifford Pinchot,  forester and politician
 Florence Collins Porter, newspaper editor, clubwoman, political campaigner,  a Republican
 Ruth Baker Pratt, Republican politician 
 Florence Pretz, inventor of the Billiken doll

R
 Mrs. James A. Reed (Lura M. Olmsted), wife of the former U.S. senator from Missouri
 Ben Reitman, anarchist and medical doctor
 Agnes Repplier, essayist
 Mrs. Alexander Revell, wife of the Illinois businessman
 The young Florence Wyman Richardson, daughter of the older Florence Wyman Richardson and sister-in-law to Ernest Hemingway
 Lucyle Roberts, rodeo rider
 Margaret Dreier Robins, labor leader
 Corinne Roosevelt Robinson, writer and lecturer
 Duchesse de la Rochefoucauld, Parisian property owner
 Ginger Rogers, actress
 Betsey Cushing Roosevelt
 Kermit Roosevelt, writer and businessman, son of Theodore Roosevelt
 President Theodore Roosevelt, his wife (Edith Roosevelt) and his daughter (Ethel Roosevelt)
 Nellie Tayloe Ross, Republican politician and ex-governor of Wyoming
 Charlotte Rumbold, St. Louis and Cleveland social reformer
 Lillian Russell, the actress
 Patrick John Ryan, Catholic prelate

S
 Pauline Sabin, Republican activist opposed to Prohibition
 Katherine Sandwina, circus strongwoman
 Birth-control advocate Margaret Sanger
 Nathaniel Schmidt, educator 
 Rose Schneiderman, labor-union executive
 Mrs. Nathan B. Scott, wife of the U.S. senator from West Virginia
 Cecil J. Sharp, who introduced folk dancing to the United States
 Finley Johnson Shepard, businessman-husband of Helen Gould
 Anna Howard Shaw, suffrage leader
 Ruth Hanna Simms, politician, activist and publisher
 Mrs. Al Smith (Catherine Ann Dunn), wife of the New York governor, and their daughter, Emily Smith Warner
 Elizabeth Blackmon Smith, popular author of romantic fiction who wrote under the name Mrs. Harry Pugh Smith
 Evangelist Gipsy Smith and his wife, Annie E. Pennock
 Senator Reed Smoot of Utah
 Ethel Annakin Snowden, British suffragist and pacifist.
 Christine Bradley South of Kentucky, chairman, Woman's Division, Republican National Committee
 Lena Jones Wade Springs, nominated for U.S. vice-president at 1924 Democratic national convention
 Katherine Stinson, aviatrix
 Rose Pastor Stokes, socialist activist, writer, and feminist 
 Winifred Sackville Stoner Jr., child prodigy
 Mrs. Edward T. Stotesbury (Eva Roberts Cromwell), wife of the investment banker
 Representative William Sulzer of New York and his wife, Clara Rodelheim 
 Thamara de Swirsky, Russian dancer[]

T
 Mrs. Charles P. Taft, wife of the newspaper publisher, and Louise Taft, their daughter
 Presidential candidate William Howard Taft and Helen Herron Taft, and their grandchildren
 Lilyan Tashman, actress
 Sara Teasdale, poet
 Ellen Terry, actress
 Luisa Tetrazzini, opera singer
 M. Louise Thomas, educator.
 Socialite Edwine Thornburgh, later married to Englishman Wilfrid Peek
 Genevieve Clark Thomson, suffragist, reporter, Louisiana politician and daughter of Speaker of the House Champ Clark
 Prince Paul Troubetzkoy, a Russian artist, and Princess Troubetzkoy, his American wife
 Grace Wilbur Trout, Illinois suffragist

U
 Harriet Taylor Upton, political activist and author, a Republican

V
 Bernard Vaughan, Roman Catholic priest from the UK
 Louise Vermilya, mass murderer
 Bertha Von Suttner, Nobel laureate
 Rube Waddell, baseball player

W

 Charlotte Walker, actress
 Eugene Walter, playwright
 Fannie Ward, actress
 Mabel Walker Willebrandt, attorney and Republican activist
 Ella Wilson, first woman mayor of Hunnewell, Kansas, reputedly the first woman mayor in the nation
 President Woodrow Wilson and his family, Mrs. Wilson, and their daughters, Margaret, Jessie, and Eleanor
 Film actress Claire Windsor
 Jane Frances Winn, who wrote under the name "Frank Fair"
 Wu Tingfang, Chinese ambassador to the United States
 Margaret (Mrs. John) Wyeth of St. Louis, delegate to 1935 Republican National Convention

Y
 Julie Chamberlain Nichols Yates, sculptor; wife of Halsey E. Yates, Army officer
 Ella Flagg Young, educator
 Mrs. Lafayette Young, wife of the Iowa newspaper publisher

References
Citations are to the St. Louis Post-Dispatch microfilm records.

Marguerite Martyn
Drawings